Ewenmar County is one of the 141 Cadastral divisions of New South Wales. It is located between the Macquarie River on the west, and the Castlereagh River on the east. This is the area between Warren and Gilgandra.

Ewenmar is believed to be derived from a local Aboriginal word.

Parishes within this county
A full list of parishes found within this county; their current LGA and mapping coordinates to the approximate centre of each location is as follows:

References

Counties of New South Wales